Dunbar–Southlands is a neighbourhood on the western side of Vancouver, British Columbia, Canada, that stretches north from the Fraser River and covers most of the land between the mouth of the Fraser and English Bay.

This neighbourhood consists of many commercial and residential areas that mostly consists of single-family dwellings.  It also contains parts of the Mackenzie Heights enclave, and is the home territory of the Musqueam Indian Band.

History
Archaeological findings shows that native First Nations have inhabited the area was early as 400 B.C.  The Fraser provided large amounts of hunting and fishing areas for Salish Indians who settled at three locations.  As recently as 15000 years ago, it was buried under a sheet of glacial ice.

In 1908, the land in the Dunbar area was owned by the Canadian Pacific Railway and was part of the now defunct, Municipality of Point Grey.  At that time, the land was unstable for development.  The first non-native settlers purchased a lot on 22nd Avenue.

By 1927, the area was served by three streetcar routes. Dunbar–Southlands became a part of Vancouver in 1929 when the Municipality of Point Grey merged with the City of Vancouver.

The first major land development in Dunbar–Southlands took place in the mid-1920s and some of the homes built during this period still stand today. Due to West Point Grey's 1922 zoning by-laws ordered that these early homes be situated on the back of their lots, those that remain, stands out as neighbourhood landmarks.

Geography

Dunbar–Southlands is bordered on the north by West 16th Avenue and on the south by the Fraser River; it stretches from the University Endowment Lands on the west to Mackenzie, Quesnel and Blenheim Streets in the east. It is centred on Dunbar Street.  Southlands lies south of Marine Drive in the floodplain of the Fraser River, and the Musqueam Indian Reserve is also encompassed by the region.

Demographics

Parks and services
The Vancouver Park Board and the Metro Vancouver Regional Parks maintains a total of 10 parks in Dunbar–Southlands, including the Pacific Spirit Park, which contains 55.5 km of trails.

The Dunbar Community Centre is jointly operated by the Vancouver Park Board and the Dunbar Community Centre Association.

The Vancouver Public Library also maintains a branch in the Dunbar–Southlands district.

The Vancouver Fire and Rescue Services operates the Vancouver Fire Hall No 21 which serves the Dunbar region.

The area also contains many golf courses including the Musqueam Golf Course, Point Grey Golf Club, Shaughnessy Golf Club, and Marine Drive Golf Club.

Notes

References

Neighbourhoods in Vancouver
Streetcar suburbs